Honky Tonk Attitude is the third studio album by American country music artist Joe Diffie. Released in 1993, it features the singles "Honky Tonk Attitude", "Prop Me Up Beside the Jukebox (If I Die)", "John Deere Green", and "In My Own Backyard", which respectively reached #5, #3, #5, and #19 on the Hot Country Songs charts. The song "If I Had Any Pride Left at All" was later recorded by John Berry on his 1995 album Standing on the Edge, from which it was released as a single.

Track listing

Personnel

Kenny Bell – acoustic guitar
Lee Bogan – background vocals
Bruce Bouton – steel guitar
Walt Cunningham – keyboards
Joe Diffie – lead vocals, background vocals
Stuart Duncan – fiddle
Paul Franklin – steel guitar
Rob Hajacos – fiddle
Yvonne Hodges – background vocals
Jim Hoke – saxophone
John Hughey – steel guitar
Bill Hullett – acoustic guitar
Carl Jackson – background vocals
Pierce Jackson – background vocals
Brent Mason – electric guitar
Tim Mensy – acoustic guitar, background vocals
Kenny Mims – electric guitar
Kim Morrison – background vocals
Larry Paxton – bass guitar
Dave Pomeroy – bass guitar
Matt Rollings – keyboards
John Wesley Ryles – background vocals
Hurshel Wiginton – background vocals
Lonnie Wilson – drums

Additional background vocals on "Prop Me Up Beside the Jukebox (If I Die)" performed by the "Epic Proportion Choir".

Charts

Weekly charts

Year-end charts

References

1993 albums
Joe Diffie albums
Epic Records albums
Albums produced by Bob Montgomery (songwriter)